Drastic Measures is the third album by Lisa Dalbello. It includes songs written together with Bryan Adams and her mother Yolanda Dalbello. Musicians invited on the album include guitarist John Goodsall, who has played with Atomic Rooster, Brand X and Bill Bruford, Jeff Baxter who is known for his work with The Doobie Brothers and Steeley Dan, and drummer Ric Parnell who was also a member of Atomic Rooster. Ben Mink, who plays violin on one song, also played with the American band Heart, singer k.d. lang and collaborated with Rush frontman Geddy Lee on Lee's 2000 solo album.

Track listing

Singles
"Never Get to Heaven"
"She Wants to Know"

Personnel
 Lisa Dalbello - vocals, piano, LM-1 drum machine
 John Goodsall, Garry Nichol - guitar
 Jeff Baxter – lead guitar on "She Wants to Know" and "What Your Mama Don't Know"
 Doug Lunn, Rick Homme - bass
 Tom Dahl - keyboards, synthesizers 
 Paul Delph - Prophet 10 synthesizer
 Bob Esty - piano
 Bruce Robb – Hammond B-3 organ solo on "It's Over"
 Ben Mink – electric violin solo on "Just Like You"
 Ric Parnell, Barry Keane - drums
 Bill Smith, Tim Thorney - percussion
 Cal Dodd, Billy Ledster, David Roberts, Bob Segarini, Tim Thorney, St. Matrona's 7th Grade Class, Bob Esty, Lisa Dalbello - backing vocals

Production
 Producers : Jim Vallance, Bob Esty 
 Produced by: Bob Esty for Fave Rave Productions
 Basic tracks for "Dr. Noble," "Just Like You" & Stereo Madness" Produced by Jim Vallance
 Recorded & Re-mixed at Cherokee Studios, Los Angeles, CA
 Basic tracks for "Bad Timing," Dr. Noble," "Just Like You" and " Stereo Madness" recorded at Manta Sound Studios, Toronto, ON
 Engineer: Hayward Parrott
 Assistant Engineers: Paul Henderson & Dave Taylor
 Engineer: Jo Robb
 Assistant Engineer: Paul Ray
 Mastered at Precision Lacquers, Hollywood CA by Stephen Marcussen
Stephen King - photography

1981 albums
Lisa Dalbello albums
Capitol Records albums